Roberta Beach Jacobson (born July 21, 1952) is an American journalist, humorist, and early ezine editor.

Biography
Born as Roberta Beach Johnson in Worcester, Massachusetts, her first publication came at age 8 in Jack and Jill. Jacobson was raised in Ohio and Illinois. Several years after her high-school graduation, she joined the United States Army which sent her to Germany. 

Jacobson remained an expatriate for decades. After leaving the armed forces, she followed in the footsteps of her newspaper editor grandfather, Robert K. Beach, and became a writer, joining the Stars & Stripes in Germany as a news clerk. In 1996, while still living in Germany, Jacobson switched to full-time freelancing. She focused on European travel articles, but also translated books, contributed humor essays to dozens of anthologies, published Japanese short-form poetry, and sold greeting card text.

In 1999, she relocated to the far-flung Greek island of Karpathos, and became the editor of an early internet ezine, Kafenio. She also edited the ezines IslandMania (2001–2003) and InsiderEuropa (2001–2003). Jacobson remained on the island until 2012, when she repatriated to the land of her birth. She settled in Indianola, Iowa.

Education 
Associate of Science, 1978, Northern Virginia Community College, Alexandria, Virginia
Bachelor of Science, 1980, University of the State of New York, Albany NY
Master of Education, 1982, Boston University, European Campus, Heidelberg, Germany
Certificate of Advanced Graduate Study, 1986, Boston University, European Campus, Heidelberg, Germany
Doctor of Philosophy in Behavioral Science, 1993, Pacific Western University, San Diego, California
Source: Jacobson's own chronicle of her educational background contained in this book Amazon.com

A selection of Jacobson's published works
Demitasse Fiction: One-Minute Reads for Busy People (Alien Buddha Press, 2023) 
Chicken Soup for the Soul: My Wonderful, Wacky Family, Amy Newmark, editor (Chicken Soup for the Soul, 2022) 
Almost Perfect: Disabled Pets and People Who Love Them, Mary A. Shafer, editor (Enspirio House, Word Forge Books 2008) 
Chicken Soup for the Beach Lover's Soul, Jack Canfield and Mark Victor Hansen, editors (Chicken Soup for the Soul, 2012) 
Chicken Soup for the Soul: Runners, Jack Canfield and Mark Victor Hansen, editors (Chicken Soup for the Soul, 2010) 
Chicken Soup for the Dieter's Soul, Jack Canfield and Mark Victor Hansen, editors (HCI, 2006) 
New Generation Beats, Debbie Tosun Kilday, editor (New Generation Beats Publications, 2022) 
Chocolate for a Woman's Heart, Kay Allenbaugh, editor  (Simon & Schuster, 2001) 
Chocolate for a Woman's Dreams, Kay Allenbaugh, editor (Simon & Schuster, 2001) 
Living and Working in Germany, by Nick Daws (Survival Books, London, 2000) 
Mini World 2006-07, Keiji Naka, editor (Macmillan LanguageHouse, Tokyo, 2006) 
Rite of Passage: Tales of Backpacking 'Round Europe, Lisa Johnson, editor (Lonely Planet Publications, London, 2003) 
The Rocking Chair Reader: Memories from the Attic, Helen Kay Polaski, editor (Adams Media, 2006) 
Sacred Fire, Maril Crabtree, editor (Adams Media, 2006) 
Simple Pleasures of the Kitchen, collected by Susannah Seton (Conari Press, 2005) 
Slang, Paul Dickson (Atria, 1998) 
Travelers' Tales Greece, Larry Habegger, Sean O'Reilly and Brian Alexander, editors  (Travelers' Tales Books, 2000) 
The New Official Rules, Paul Dickson (Addison-Wesley Publishing Company Inc., 1989) 
Unconditional Love, compiled by Avie Townsend (Heliographica, 2004) 
Women Runners, Irene Reti and Bettianne Shoney Sien, editors (Breakaway Books, 2001) 
The Writer's Handbook 2002 edited by Elfrieda Abbe (Kalmbach Publ., 2001) 
Friedemann Pfäfflin, Astrid Junge - SEX REASSIGNMENT. Thirty Years of International Follow-up Studies After Sex Reassignment Surgery: A Comprehensive Review, 1961-1991 (Translated from German into American English by Roberta B. Jacobson and Alf B. Meier), Symposium publications IJT Electronic Books 1998
Source: Amazon.com

References 
RobertaJacobson.com
amazon.com
pw.org
authorsden.com
50-Word Stories
livinghaikuanthology.com

External links 
Cold Moon Journal
Five Fleas (Itchy Poetry)

1952 births
American humorists
American magazine editors
Living people
Writers from Worcester, Massachusetts
Women humorists
American women non-fiction writers
Women magazine editors
21st-century American women